William Joseph Halloway (born 1912) was a rugby league footballer in the New South Wales Rugby League (NSWRL) competition. Halloway played for the Eastern Suburbs in 1935, the season that the club won their fifth premiership. Halloway played for the South Sydney Rabbitohs the following season.

References
The Encyclopedia Of Rugby League; Alan Whiticker & Glen Hudson

External links
Reference Page.com page

1912 births
Australian rugby league players
Possibly living people
Place of birth missing (living people)
Rugby league halfbacks
South Sydney Rabbitohs players
Sydney Roosters players